British singer Jay Sean has released four studio albums, two compilation albums, two extended plays, two mixtapes, fifty-one singles (including nine as a featured artist) and thirty-one music videos.

Albums

Studio albums

Compilation albums

Mixtapes

Extended plays

Singles

As lead artist

As featured artist

Surma Surma Reached No.1 on UK Asian Music Charts.

Promotional singles

Guest appearances

Songwriting credits

Music videos

Notes

References

Sean, Jay
Rhythm and blues discographies
Discography